Toivo Pietari Johannes Kärki (3 December 1915 – 30 April 1992) was a Finnish composer, musician, music producer and arranger. He is especially remembered for his collaboration with Reino Helismaa.

Kärki composed approximately 1400 recorded compositions, many of which had several versions, and wrote hundreds of unrecorded songs. He composed the music for about 50 films, several revues, theatrical plays, and radio comedies. He also arranged a large number of songs written by other people. He trained several of Finland's most important popular music lyricists. During his career, he helped dozens of singers get started in the industry, many of which remain active to this day.

He made himself an important name in Finnish tango.

He is buried in the Hietaniemi Cemetery in Helsinki.

References

External links 
 Full Moon by Toivo Kärki - Trey Lee(vc), Jarkko Riihimäki(p)

1915 births
1992 deaths
People from Pirkkala
People from Häme Province (Grand Duchy of Finland)
Finnish male composers
Finnish tango musicians
Finnish music arrangers
Finnish military personnel of World War II
Burials at Hietaniemi Cemetery
20th-century male musicians
20th-century Finnish composers